The Afridis are a Pashtun tribe.

Afridi may also refer to:

 Afridi (surname)
 Afridi (Carthage), an ancient people of north Africa
 , two ships of the Royal Navy